Robert Leslie Harrison (9 May 1903 – 15 April 1966) was a dairy farmer and member of the Queensland Legislative Assembly.

Biography
Harrison was born at Beenleigh, Queensland, to parents Robert Harrison and his wife Sarah (née Kerlin). He went to Gleneagle and Beaudesert State Schools before attending Brisbane Grammar School at Spring Hill, Brisbane. He became a dairy farmer at Gleneagle, Beaudesert.

During World War II Harrison was a member of the Volunteer Defence Corps and was a member of the District War Agricultural Committee.
He was a member of the Queensland Milk Board from 1940 until 1952 and then was on the coordinating board for stock routes and watering facilities. He was also a member of the CSIRO State Committee from 1950 to 1965 and was also a member of several dairy related groups.

On 24 January 1929 he married Sheila Mimosa Joyce (died 1992) and together had one son and two daughters. He died in April 1966, shortly before the 1966 state elections and was cremated at Mount Thompson Crematorium.

Political career
At the 1957 Queensland elections, Harrison won the seat of Darlington for the Country Party. He remained the member until Darlington was abolished for the 1960 state election, and moved to the seat of Logan. He remained its member until ill health forced him to announce his resignation shortly before his death in 1966.

References

Members of the Queensland Legislative Assembly
1903 births
1966 deaths
National Party of Australia members of the Parliament of Queensland
20th-century Australian politicians